The  (Tower of the Reformer) is a 71.85 meter (236 ft.) tall steel framework tower in Zone 9 of Guatemala City. The tower was built in 1935, to commemorate the 100th anniversary of the birth of Justo Rufino Barrios, who was President of Guatemala and instituted a number of reforms.
The basic shape of the structure resembles the Eiffel Tower. It was originally constructed with a bell on its top, which in 1986 was replaced with a beacon.

Commemorative plaque
A plaque at the base reads:

which roughly translates to English as:

With a height of 71.85 meters, the Commemorative Tower of the 19 of the July (later renamed Tower of the Reformer) was inaugurated on the 19 of July 1935 by General Jorge Ubico Castañeda, in commemoration of the one hundredth anniversary of the birth of  General Justo Rufino Barrios.

From its inauguration it has been located at 15th of September Boulevard and General Miguel García Granados Street, currently 7th Avenue and 2nd Street, Zone 9.

The Tower of the Reformer was constructed in the United States, with galvanized iron, to a cost of Q49,775.60 and was assembled by the Engineer Arturo Bickford, Mayor of the City at that time.

The Government of Belgium donated the bell that is suspended inside its structure. The light, as well as the beacon and the landscaping of the bases, constitute a contribution of the company PUBLICAR, S.A. for the embellishment of this monument that, through the years, has become a perpetual symbol of our beautiful city.

Guatemala de la Asunción, August 23 of 1997.

History
The tower had been fabricated by the United States Steel Products Company. Its original name was "".

The first electric illumination of the tower happened on 26 September 1958 and was financed by the brewery company Cervecería Centro Americana.

The original beacon light installed on top of the tower burnt out in 1969. The second one, which also burnt out, was replaced in 1984. In 1994, after 10 years of service, the third beacon light was replaced by a fourth one that was donated by the US airline company American Airlines.

Incidents
On 19 December 1985, a 16-year teenager escalated the tower to meditate but froze and could not climb back down. The tower is also a prime spot for suicide attempts. The tower is also sometimes climbed by drunk people.

See also
List of towers

References

External links

 

Towers in Guatemala
Tourist attractions in Guatemala
Monuments and memorials in Guatemala
Buildings and structures in Guatemala City
Towers completed in 1935